Mountain lodge may refer to:

 Mountain hut, a building in the mountains providing food and shelter for mountaineers
 Mountain Lodge, the former governor's house in Hong Kong
 Mountain Lodge (horse), the former British racehorse